Chak De! India (English: Go For it! India) is a 2007 Indian Hindi-language sports film directed by Shimit Amin and produced by Aditya Chopra. It had its music composed by Salim–Sulaiman, with a screenplay written by Jaideep Sahni. The film stars Shah Rukh Khan in the lead role and features 16 others in supporting roles. The film's plot focuses on Kabir Khan (Khan), the former captain of the Indian men's national field hockey team. After a disastrous loss to the Pakistan men's national field hockey team, Khan is ostracized from the sport owing to religious prejudice. Seven years later in an attempt to redeem himself, he becomes the coach for the Indian national women's hockey team, with the goal of turning its sixteen contentious players into an award-winning team.

Produced on a budget of 200 million, Chak De! India was released on 10 August 2007 to positive reviews. It was commercially successful, grossing over 1.01 billion worldwide. Its direction, story, and performances of the cast members have received the most attention from award groups. The film won 43 awards from 72 nominations.

Chak De! India won Best Popular Film Providing Wholesome Entertainment at the 55th National Film Awards ceremony. At the 53rd Filmfare Awards, it received twelve nominations and won five, including those for Critics Best Film, Best Actor, Best Action, Best Cinematography and Best Editing.

On 30 August 2007, the Academy of Motion Picture Arts and Sciences requested a copy of the film's script for a place in its Margaret Herrick Library. When the Indian Hockey Federation was reorganised in April 2008, former player Aslam Sher Khan said that he wanted "to create a 'Chak De' effect" in Indian hockey. The film was screened in New Delhi on 17 August 2016, as part of the week long Independence Day Film Festival. The festival was jointly presented by the Indian Directorate of Film Festivals and Ministry of Defense, commemorating India's 70th Independence Day.

Awards and nominations

See also 
 List of Bollywood films of 2007

Notes

References

External links 
 Accolades for Chak De! India at the Internet Movie Database
 List of awards from official site

Chak De! India